The European Diploma of Protected Areas, established in 1965, is a diploma awarded by the Council of Europe to protected areas (natural or semi-natural) of exceptional European conservational interest. It is awarded for a five-year period at a time and is renewable. Over 60 areas in 23 states have received the award so far.

Awarded areas
Armenia
 Khosrov Forest State Reserve
Austria
 Krimmler Wasserfälle
 Thayatal National Park
 Wachau
Belarus
 Berezinsky Nature Reserve
Belgium
 Hautes Fagnes
Czech Republic
 Biele Karpaty Protected Landscape Area
 Karlštejn National Nature Reserve
 Podyjí
Estonia
 Matsalu National Park
Finland
 Ekenäs Archipelago National Park
 Seitseminen National Park
France
 Camargue National Reserve
 Écrins National Park
 Mercantour National Park
 Port-Cros National Park
 Scandola Nature Reserve
 Vanoise National Park
Germany
 Bavarian Forest National Park
 Berchtesgaden National Park
 Lüneburg Heath Nature Reserve
 German-Luxembourg Nature Park
 Siebengebirge Nature Reserve
 Weltenburger Enge Nature Reserve
 Wollmatinger Ried Nature Reserve
 Wurzacher Ried Nature Reserve
Greece
 Cretan White Mountains National Park (Samaria)
Hungary
 Ipolytarnóc Nature Conservation Area
 Szenas Hills Protected Area
 Tihany peninsula
Italy
 Gran Paradiso National Park
 Maremma Nature Park
 Maritime Alps Nature Park
 Montecristo Island Nature Reserve
 Parco naturale di Migliarino, San Rossore, Massaciuccoli
 Parco Nazionale d'Abruzzo, Lazio e Molise
 Sasso Fratino Integral Nature Reserve
Luxemburg
 German-Luxembourg Nature Park
 Netherlands
 De Boschplaat
 Weerribben
 Oostvaardersplassen
 Naardermeer
Poland
 Białowieża Forest
 Bieszczady National Park
Romania
 Danube Delta
 Piatra Craiului National Park
 Retezat National Park
Russia
 Oka National Biosphere Reserve
 Kostomuksha Strict Nature Reserve
 Teberda National Reserve
 Tsentralno-Chernozemny Biosphere Reserve
Slovakia
 Poloniny National Park
 Dobrocsky National Nature Reserve
Slovenia
Triglav National Park
Spain
 Doñana National Park
 Ordesa y Monte Perdido National Park
 Teide
Sweden
 Muddus
 Sarek National Park
 Store Mosse National Park
 Bullerö Nature Reserve
Switzerland
 Swiss National Park
Turkey
 Kuşcenneti National Park
Ukraine
 Carpathian Biosphere Reserve
United Kingdom
 Peak District National Park
 Minsmere Nature Reserve
 Beinn Eighe National Nature Reserve
 Purbeck Heritage Coast
 Fair Isle National Scenic Area

External links
The European Diploma of Protected Areas (the Council of Europe)

Protected areas of Europe